Vukčević is a Serbo-Croatian patronymic surname, derived from the male given name Vukac. Notable people with the surname include:

Andrija Vukčević (born 1996), Montenegrin footballer
Boris Vukčević (born 1990), Croatian-born German footballer
Dušan Vukčević (born 1975), Serbian basketball player
Marina Vukčević-Rajčić (born 1993), Montenegrin handball player
Milenko Vukčević (born 1966), Yugoslav footballer
Nenad Vukčević (born 1974), Montenegrin footballer
Nikola Vukčević (disambiguation), multiple people
Nikolina Vukčević (born 2000), Montenegrin handball player
Radomir Vukčević (1941–2014), Yugoslav footballer
Risto Vukčević (1929–1994), Montenegrin politician
Sara Vukčević (born 1992), Montenegrin handball player
Simon Vukčević (born 1986), Montenegrin footballer
Tristan Vukčević (born 2003), basketball player
Vojislav Vukčević (born 1938), Serbian Minister of the Diaspora
Žarko Vukčević (born 1957), Montenegrin footballer

See also
Vukcevich
 Vukičević
 Vukićević

Montenegrin surnames
Serbian surnames
Croatian surnames
Patronymic surnames
Surnames from given names